Gordon Scarlett (born 17 August 1967) is a Jamaican swimmer. He competed in three events at the 1984 Summer Olympics.

References

External links
 

1967 births
Living people
Jamaican male swimmers
Olympic swimmers of Jamaica
Swimmers at the 1984 Summer Olympics
Place of birth missing (living people)